Boynton is a ghost town in Angelina County, in the U.S. state of Texas. It is located within the Lufkin, Texas micropolitan area.

History
The area in what is known as Boynton today was settled in 1904 and was founded by the Boynton Lumber Company. The mill was closed in 1908 and Boynton became a ghost town shortly after. Only a few scattered houses remained in the early 1990s.

Geography

Education
Today, the ghost town is located within the Huntington Independent School District.

See also
List of ghost towns in Texas

References

Geography of Angelina County, Texas
Ghost towns in East Texas